is a former Japanese football player. He has played in Japan, Singapore, Thailand and India at the top level.

Playing career
Sueoka started his professional career in the J2 League with Albirex Niigata club. He then moved to Albirex Niigata Singapore on loan, where he stayed for the 2004 season, scoring 12 times in 24 appearances. He returned to his parent club for a season but appeared only sparingly before returning to Singapore, this time with Geylang United. He then played for Balestier Khalsa for the 2007 season before moving to Thailand with Bangkok United.
  
In 2011, coaches in the I-League named Sueoka best player.

Club statistics

References

External links

1979 births
Living people
Association football people from Yamaguchi Prefecture
Japanese footballers
J1 League players
J2 League players
Albirex Niigata players
Singapore Premier League players
Albirex Niigata Singapore FC players
Geylang International FC players
Balestier Khalsa FC players
Ryuji Sueoka
Ryuji Sueoka
I-League players
Mohun Bagan AC players
Salgaocar FC players
Dempo SC players
East Bengal Club players
Japanese expatriate footballers
Japanese expatriate sportspeople in India
Expatriate footballers in Singapore
Expatriate footballers in Thailand
Expatriate footballers in India
Association football midfielders
Calcutta Football League players